Veendam (abbreviation: Vdm) is an unstaffed railway station in Veendam in the Netherlands. It is located on the Stadskanaal–Zuidbroek railway after Zuidbroek as the present-day line terminus.

Location 
The railway station is located at the Parallelweg in the village of Veendam in the province of Groningen in the northeast of the Netherlands. It is situated on the Stadskanaal–Zuidbroek railway, where it is the present-day line terminus before the railway station Zuidbroek.

History 
The station was previously served by passenger trains from 1 August 1910 to 17 May 1953. The station reopened on 1 May 2011, when the Veendam–Zuidbroek section of the Stadskanaal–Zuidbroek railway was reopened to passenger services.

Train services

Bus services

References

External links

 Veendam station, station information

Railway stations in Groningen (province)
Railway stations on the Stadskanaal–Zuidbroek railway
Railway stations opened in 1910
Railway stations opened in 2011
Railway stations closed in 1953
Rijksmonuments in Groningen (province)
Veendam